Hetzles is a municipality in the district of Forchheim in Bavaria in Germany. The Municipality Hetzles includes the villages of Hetzles and Honings.

References

Forchheim (district)